Troldhede station is a railway station serving the small railway town of Troldhede in Western Jutland, Denmark.

Troldhede station is located on the Skanderborg–Skjern line. The station opened in 1881. From 1917 to 1968 it was the northern terminus of the Troldhede-Kolding-Vejen railway line from Troldhede to Kolding. It offers direct regional train services to Aarhus, Skjern and Esbjerg operated by Arriva.

Architecture 
The station building was designed by the Danish architect Niels Peder Christian Holsøe.

References

Citations

Bibliography

External links

 Banedanmark – government agency responsible for maintenance and traffic control of most of the Danish railway network
 Arriva – British multinational public transport company operating bus and train services in Denmark
 Danske Jernbaner – website with information on railway history in Denmark

Railway stations opened in 1881
Railway stations in the Central Denmark Region
Railway stations in Denmark opened in the 19th century